Maragondahalli is a census town in the southern state of Karnataka, India. It is located in the Anekal taluk of Bangalore Urban district.

References

Cities and towns in Bangalore Urban district